Cléber Luis Rodrigues (born 6 November 1983) is a Brazilian football player. He has played professionally in Brazil, Czech Republic, Armenia and Slovakia.

Career

Cléber began his career in his native Brazil with São Carlos. Between 2006 and 2010 he failed to make an impact at São Carlos and spent time on loan in the Czech Republic with Sigma Olomouc, Armenia with Mika Yerevan, Slovakia with Tatran Prešov and in his native land with Mirassol and Brasil de Pelotas.

He left São Carlos in 2010 and moved to AQA and from there to Botafogo de Ribeirão Preto, spending just six months and making just two appearances with each. From there he made the move to Sertãozinho in January 2011, making a further two appearances and moving on yet again in summer 2011 to Batatais FC, where he was more successful, making 14 appearances before his most recent move, to Ypiranga in January 2012. He has made three appearances for Ypiranga to date.

1. FC Tatran Prešov
On 11 January 2008, Cléber signed one-year contract for Slovak club Tatran Prešov.

References

External links
1. FC Tatran Prešov Profile

Association football midfielders
Brazilian footballers
SK Sigma Olomouc players
Czech First League players
FC Mika players
1. FC Tatran Prešov players
2. Liga (Slovakia) players
Slovak Super Liga players
Expatriate footballers in the Czech Republic
Expatriate footballers in Armenia
Expatriate footballers in Slovakia
Brazilian expatriate sportspeople in Slovakia
Brazilian expatriate sportspeople in Armenia
Brazilian expatriate sportspeople in the Czech Republic
Armenian Premier League players
1983 births
Living people
People from São Carlos
Footballers from São Paulo (state)